Province of South Australia may refer to:
 Anglican Province of South Australia
 British Province of South Australia